The Norwegian Seafood Federation (FHL) is an employers' organisation in Norway, organized under the national Confederation of Norwegian Enterprise.

The current CEO is Geir Andreassen. Chairman of the board is Ole-Eirik Lerøy.

References

External links
Official site

Employers' organisations in Norway